Hesar Darreh (also Romanized as Ḩeşār Darreh; also known as Hasan Darreh and Ḩeşār Deh) is a village in Zalian Rural District, Zalian District, Shazand County, Markazi Province, Iran. At the 2006 census, its population was 76, in 23 families.

References 

Populated places in Shazand County